Truro railway station serves the city of Truro, Cornwall, England. It is situated on the Cornish Main Line and is the junction for the Maritime Line to Falmouth Docks.

The station is managed by Great Western Railway, which serves the station alongside CrossCountry.

History

The station opened with the Cornwall Railway on 4 May 1859 when it was very different from today. A train shed roofed over the space between the two platforms and the level crossing was much busier and at the other end of the building, where the branch platform is today. A contemporary report tells us that "the passenger station here is a handsome stone building, one hundred and thirty feet long, with large projecting roof; and containing in the centre of the building a spacious booking office, having separate entrances for first, second and third class passengers. On each side of this are comfortable first and second class waiting rooms, parcels' room, superintendent's office, and the other conveniences of a first class station. Inside the station is the passenger platform, one hundred and sixty-one feet long by fourteen feet wide, and beyond this three lines of broad gauge rails. Then the arrival platform, which is of the same length of that on the opposite side, and twenty feet wide. The whole of the space occupied by these rails and platforms are covered by a double roof, of the respective spans of fifty-seven and forty-one feet, with iron tie and suspension rods on a novel principle. The light, airy and forceful appearance of these roofs has excited the admiration of every person who has viewed them."

A stone goods shed was built in front of the station and an engine shed beyond the passenger platforms: "one hundred feet long, and forty-five feet wide, with double line of rails, and accommodation for six engines. Outside of the latter building are a smithery and workmens' shops, in which any casual repairs that may be required, can be executed. This building being erected on 'made ground' is constructed of timber, as being lighter than stone."

The West Cornwall Railway shared the station, which was managed by joint committee of the two railways. This line came from  through the tunnel but was only standard gauge until 1 March 1867 when it had a third rail laid to allow both broad gauge and standard gauge trains (the rail had actually been laid the previous year but was only used for goods trains for a while). In the meantime the Cornwall Railway had extended its rails to Falmouth. The West Cornwall Railway kept its station at Newham Quay to handle goods traffic to the town (Truro did not become a city until 1877) and waterfront, the branch crossing the Falmouth line on the level just beyond Highertown Tunnel at Penwithers Junction.

Two of Brunel's timber viaducts carried the line high above the town. Immediately outside the station was Carvedras Viaduct, 86 feet above St George's Road and 969 feet long. After passing the site of the castle, the line then passed over Truro Viaduct, which with 20 stone piers stretched to 1,329 feet and was the longest viaduct in Cornwall, although it was only 92 feet high. They were replaced with stone viaducts in 1902 and 1904 respectively, although the original piers still stand.

The Cornwall Railway was amalgamated into the Great Western Railway on 1 July 1889.

The goods shed was rebuilt quite early on to accommodate the heavy traffic handled. The passenger station was rebuilt in 1897 when the roof was removed, new buildings provided, a new engine shed built nearer the tunnel, and the level crossing removed to the east end. It was at this time that a third footbridge was added across the station in place of the level crossing, access to this being from the road rather than the platforms.

The Great Western Railway was nationalised into British Railways from 1 January 1948 which was privatised in the 1990s.

Facilities

The main entrance to the brick-built station is on the south side of the line, leading directly to the platform used by trains to Penzance. The station buffet is along this platform on the left, and the bay platform that is used for trains to Falmouth is beyond this. The long-stay car park is situated behind this eastbound platform and access is over the level crossing. There are Gateline ticket barriers in operation at the station, with Truro being the only station in Cornwall to have these installed.

Platform layout 

 Platform 1 is for trains to Falmouth Docks
 Platform 2 for down trains towards St Erth and Penzance
 Platform 3 for up trains towards Plymouth, London Paddington and Bristol

The platform for trains to Plymouth and beyond can be reached by either of two footbridges, one at either end of the station, but both platforms have step-free access from the level crossing at the east end of the platform.

Platform 3 is a bi-directional platform and is able to serve trains in both directions, including trains to and from Falmouth as well. Typically during times where a train to Falmouth has been cancelled and is occupying platform 1, the next Falmouth directly after will use platform 3 if the half-hourly service is still in place.

Passenger volume
Truro is the busiest station in Cornwall.  Comparing the year from April 2007 to that which started in April 2002, passenger numbers increased by 44%.From 2002 to 2010 the increase is 81%

The statistics cover twelve month periods that start in April.

Services

Some trains run through to or from London Paddington station, including the Night Riviera overnight sleeping car service. There are a limited number of CrossCountry trains providing a service to North England and Scotland in the morning and returning in the evening.

The Maritime Line from  terminates in Truro.  Since May 2009, this line has run 2 trains per hour in each direction for most of the day, with a reduced, hourly service on Sundays.

Signalling 

Signal boxes had been built to control the complex layout at Truro by 1880. These were replaced by a new Truro West signal box in 1897 and a new Truro East in 1899.  These were both Great Western Railway Type 7A signal boxes.  The West box, which was situated on the north side of the line near the entrance to the engine shed, was closed on 7 November 1971 when the East box, situated on the same side of the line just east of the level crossing, was renamed as just "Truro".

The adjacent signal boxes are at Par railway station to the east, and at Roskear Junction, Camborne, to the west. The Falmouth branch is operated under authority from tokens which are kept in interlocked machines on platform 3 and at Falmouth Docks railway station. At the same time a new signal (number TR26) was placed at the west end of the eastbound platform to allow trains to reverse back to Penzance or Falmouth without shunting across to another platform.

References

External links

Railway stations in Cornwall
Former Great Western Railway stations
Railway stations in Great Britain opened in 1859
Railway stations served by CrossCountry
Railway stations served by Great Western Railway
Truro
DfT Category C1 stations